Annie Creek, is a small river in the Hart Ranges of the Northern Rockies of British Columbia.

References

Northern Interior of British Columbia
Rivers of the Canadian Rockies
Rivers of British Columbia